Black Pearl is a sailing yacht launched in 2016, which is  in length. The yacht was known during its build process originally as Oceanco Y712 and thereafter as "Project Solar". The hull is steel, the superstructure aluminum, and the masts carbon fiber. The yacht is owned by the family of Russian billionaire Oleg Burlakov, who died in 2021.

It is expected that Black Pearl can cross the Atlantic using only  of fuel, aided by regenerative technologies. One key technology to support this is to use the speed of the vessel through the water under sail to generate electricity with a variable pitch propeller. The yacht also features heat capture technologies and large scale storage batteries to capture energy generated but not immediately used.

Background
In the 21st century, the largest sailing yachts greatly increased in size. Yachts like Athena and Mirabella V were a big increase, and followed by Maltese Falcon. In the 2010s, a host of similar and larger yachts came to fruition, including Sailing Yacht A, Aquijo, and Black Pearl.

While these vessels are large for sailing yachts, this size is more common among motor yachts. There are quite a number of large sailing vessels for other purposes, especially those for passenger cruises.

Build history

The creation of the yacht, then known as "Project Solar", began on 7 July 2010 when Ken Freivokh was contracted to handle styling and design on the project. Given their involvement with Maltese Falcon, Freivokh introduced Dykstra Naval Architects to the project, and the team were able to advance the DynaRig system and to improve performance through changes both to mast shape and installation. The  preliminary concept that resulted was codenamed "Nautilus".

Freivokh then commissioned Devonport Yachts (Pendennis Shipyards) to undertake technical studies to complete the tendering package. The tendering process began in June 2011 and included seven shipyards worldwide.

Dutch builders Oceanco were selected from the tendering process to construct the yacht at their Rotterdam shipyard.

The design and details of the yacht developed continuously during the build process, with the owner having a direct input on many aspects of the final design. The final design had the yacht at 106.8 m, and the yacht, built under the name Y712, was then named Black Pearl.

The overall yacht design was done by Ken Freivokh, Gerard Villate, Nigel Gee, and Nuvolari Lenard, with others. The yacht was constructed at Oceanco in Alblasserdam, and launched in September 2016.

It was delivered in early 2018 to the customer, after it had undergone sea trials.

DynaRig System
The DynaRig owes its origin to Wilhelm Prölss' research in the 1960s. The DynaRig consists of freestanding rotating masts with rigid yards and acts as a square rig.  Each of Black Pearls masts supports six yards, which, unlike a conventional square rigger, have built-in camber of 12%. The fifteen square sails are set between the yards in such a way that when deployed there are no gaps in the sail plan of each mast, enabling them to act as a single airfoil. The furling sails are stored in the mast and can be deployed along tracks on the yards in six minutes. The sails are trimmed by rotating the masts. As there is no rigging, the masts and yards can be rotated without restriction for all points of sail, making Black Pearl a capable upwind clipper.

Summary

She is capable of accommodating up to 12 guests in one master suite, two VIP and two double guests cabins.

As a private yacht, Black Pearl can accommodate 12 guests and has various features, including an on-deck Jacuzzi, convertible cinema, full beam beach club, and a tender garage. Total interior volume is 2,700 gross tons. She won the Sailing Superyacht of the Year Award in 2019.

Specifications:
Length - 106.7 meters (350 feet)
Gross tonnage - 2700 t (measure of interior volume)
Guest capacity - 12 people (6 cabins)
Sail Area -  2,900 square metres
Max sail speed - 30 knots (56 km/h, 35 mph)

Timeline:
Contract - 2010
Purchased - 2012
Launched - 2016
Delivered - 2018 
Registered to Cayman Islands

Fuelless transatlantic voyager capability
Black Pearl is designed to generate electricity to power its on-board systems by using its propeller as a turbine as the yacht is propelled by the wind.

Under sea trials, Black Pearl achieved 20 knots of speed on the water, and its developers expect that it will be able to transit the Atlantic using no fuel.

See also
 List of yachts built by Oceanco
 List of large sailing yachts

References

External links

Individual sailing yachts
2016 ships